Giuli Mandzhgaladze (born 9 September 1992) is a Ukrainian professional footballer who plays as a midfielder for FC Dinamo Batumi in the Erovnuli Liga.

Career
He spent four years playing for the FC Zorya Luhansk reserves team in the Ukrainian Premier Reserve League. In July 2014 Mandzhgaladze signed a contract with FC Poltava and played in the Ukrainian First League, but in September he left the club.

Mandzhgaladze signed for FC Dinamo Batumi in the Erovnuli Liga in January 2019.

Honours
Torpedo Kutaisi
Georgian Cup: 2022

Dinamo Batumi
 Erovnuli Liga: 2021
 Georgian Super Cup: 2022

Samtredia
 Umaglesi Liga: 2016
 Georgian Super Cup: 2017

Sioni Bolnisi
Georgian Cup: Runners-up 2015-16

References

External links 
 
 
 

1992 births
Living people
Ukrainian footballers
FC Poltava players
FC Chikhura Sachkhere players
FC Sioni Bolnisi players
FK Ventspils players
Latvian Higher League players
Ukrainian First League players
Ukrainian expatriate footballers
Expatriate footballers in Georgia (country)
Ukrainian expatriate sportspeople in Georgia (country)
Ukrainian people of Georgian descent
FC Samtredia players
Association football midfielders
Kapaz PFK players
FC Dinamo Batumi players
Erovnuli Liga players
Expatriate footballers in Azerbaijan
Expatriate footballers in Latvia
Ukrainian expatriate sportspeople in Azerbaijan
Ukrainian expatriate sportspeople in Latvia